The Regenerates is a surviving 1917 silent film drama directed by E. Mason Hopper and starring Alma Rubens. It was produced and distributed by the Triangle Film Corporation.

Cast
Alma Rubens - Catherine Ten Eyck
Walt Whitman - Mynderse Van Dyun
Darrell Foss - Pell Van Dyun
John Lince - Owen Duffy
Allan Sears - Paul La Farge
Louis Durnham - William Slade
William Brady - James Forbes
Pauline Starke - Nora Duffy

Preservation status
The film is preserved in the George Eastman House collection and the Library of Congress collection.

References

External links
 The Regenerates at IMDb.com

1917 films
American silent feature films
Films directed by E. Mason Hopper
Triangle Film Corporation films
American black-and-white films
Silent American drama films
1917 drama films
1910s American films